Stops of Various Quills is a 1895 book written by William Dean Howells. 55 pages in length, it features 43 poems and illustrations by Howard Pyle.

Overview

Howells had bonded with Pyle over similar ideas about literary realism and romance in literature and Pyle suggested a professional collaboration in 1891. Several poems by Howells with Pyle's illustration were published in Harper's Weekly before being collected as part of Stops of Various Quills. Henry Clarence Pitz, illustrator and Howard Pyle biographer, describes this collaborative work as "a labor of love"—where the "great kinship" that existed between author and illustrator is evident in "both text and picture." Howells and Pyle both lost children early in the year 1889; Howells, a daughter named Winifred and Pyle, a son named Sellers. Pitz relates how they "both suffered from interludes of melancholia" as a result—a term found etched in illustrations on the pages of "November" and "Question".

Drawing comparison to work of the Boecklin school, Pyle's illustrations have been described as lavish, and adorn each page. An "édition de luxe" was published (with a publication date of 1896), "limited to fifty copies, each signed by Mr. Howells and Mr. Pyle, with illustrations printed in sepia, and the full-page illustrations on Japan proofs in black." This edition sold for $15.

Responses and analysis
The phrase "stops of various Quills" first appears in John Milton's poem "Lycidas", which was written in 1637. Howells's poems have been said to vary widely in craftsmanship. The sonnet "The Bewildered Guest", featured in Stops of Various Quills, is considered to be one of his most quoted works. Stops of Various Quills has been said to be of high quality and merit. In conjunction with Poems, Howells was said to be a "major force in the shaping of American literature." It also was noted as dispelling the belief that Howells was a "fatheaded optimist."

References

Sources

External links

Stops of Various Quills (with illustrations) at Archive.org

American poetry collections
Harper & Brothers books
1895 poetry books